SCDA could refer to:

The ICAO airport code for Diego Aracena International Airport, Chile
The South Carolina Department of Agriculture, government organization
Tom Clancy's Splinter Cell: Double Agent, a video game
Stabilized constant descent angle approach, aviation: non-precision approach procedure aimed at minimizing the vertical manoeuvring required while flying most non-precision approaches from the final approach segment through to touch down.